Ektachrome is a brand name owned by Kodak for a range of transparency, still, and motion picture films previously available in many formats, including 35 mm and sheet sizes to 11 × 14 inch size. Ektachrome has a distinctive look that became familiar to many readers of National Geographic, which used it extensively for color photographs for decades in settings where Kodachrome was too slow. In terms of reciprocity characteristics, Ektachrome is stable at shutter speeds between ten seconds and 1/10,000 of a second.

 

Ektachrome, initially developed in the early 1940s, allowed professionals and amateurs alike to process their own films.  It also made color reversal film more practical in larger formats, and the Kodachrome Professional film in sheet sizes was later discontinued.

High Speed Ektachrome, announced in 1959 provided an ASA 160 color film, which was much faster than Kodachrome. In 1968, Kodak started offering push processing of this film, allowing it to be used at ASA 400.

Whereas the development process used by Kodachrome is technically intricate and beyond the means of amateur photographers and smaller photographic labs, Ektachrome processing is simpler, and small professional labs could afford equipment to develop the film. Many process variants (designated E-1 through E-6) were used to develop it over the years. Modern Ektachrome films are developed using the E-6 process, which can be carried out by small labs or by a keen amateur using a basic film tank and tempering bath to maintain the temperature at 100 °F (38 °C).

Ektachrome has occasionally been used as a motion picture film stock, such as in the 1999 film Three Kings and the 2006 film Inside Man, in which each used cross processing in C-41 color negative chemistry to give a unique appearance.

It was also used in the 1998 film Buffalo '66, although it was processed regularly for this.

Several years before Ektachrome's discontinuation, some of Kodak's consumer E-6 films were rebranded as Elite Chrome. In late 2009, Kodak announced the discontinuation of Ektachrome 64T (EPY) and Ektachrome 100 Plus (EPP) films, citing declining sales. On February 4, 2011, Kodak announced the discontinuance of Ektachrome 200 on its website. On March 1, 2012, Kodak announced the discontinuance of three color Ektachrome films. In December 2012 Kodak announced its discontinuance of Ektachrome 100D color reversal movie film in certain formats.  By late 2013, all Ektachrome products were discontinued.

On September 25, 2018, Kodak announced that the 35 mm format of Ektachrome was again available, while Super 8 and 16 mm motion picture versions would be available later.

Processing

Although Kodachrome is often considered a superior film due to its archival qualities and color palette, advances in dye and coupler technology blurred the boundaries between the differing processes, along with Kodak having abandoned Kodachrome research and development after the mid-1990s. Furthermore, the developing of Kodachrome always required a complex, fickle process requiring an on-site analytical lab and typically required a turnaround of several days to allow for shipping times.  By contrast, small professional labs have been able to process Ektachrome on-site since the 1950s, with product safety and effluent discharge having been drastically improved since the 1970s, when Kodak reformulated their entire color chemistry lineup.  It is even possible for amateur labs to process Ektachrome within an hour using a rotary tube processor (made by Jobo, WingLynch or PhotoTherm), sink-line, or even by hand inversion in a small drum and E-2, E-4, and E-6 processing chemistry kits were sold for home darkrooms.

Variants
 Before Process AR-5 there was EA-5 for aero film. This is a hot version of E-4 and similar to ME-4 for Ektachrome motion picture film.
 E-6 was made available to the public in 1975, but only the pro films were available at the time. There were some color stability ("keeping") issues to verify before the amateur films could be released.
 E-7 is the "mix-it-yourself" version of E-6. Functionally it was equivalent, but there were a few differences.
 ES-8 is a special process for one type of Super 8mm movie film. It was introduced in 1975.

There were some other Ektachrome processes for 16 mm motion picture films:
 ME-2A
 ECO-2
 EC0-3
 E-89
 E-99
 VNF-1 ("Video News Film", as this film was originally introduced for 16 mm news gathering)
 RVNP
 CRI-1

The following processes are used for amateur Ektachrome super 8 mm movie film:
 Ektachrome Movie process introduced in 1971 (movies without movie lights). The process was later designated EM-24
 EM-25 is the mix-it-yourself version of EM-24.
 EM-26 is the updated process for improved Ektachrome super 8 films introduced in 1981.
 EM-27 is the mix-it-yourself version of EM-26.

Process history
 E-1 Initial Ektachrome process for sheet and roll film (1946 – c. 1950s)
 E-2 Updated Ektachrome process for roll film and 135 film (1955–1966). A 1959 modification was called "improved" E-2.
 E-3 Updated "professional" Ektachrome process for sheet film and Kodak EP professional rollfilm (1959 to 1976)  
 E-4 Updated Ektachrome process for roll film and 135 film (1966–1996, see note) E-4 was better at resisting fading than the earlier processes, with a life around 30 years.
 E-5 Research project, only saw minor use in a revised form as the aerial film process AR-5
 E-6 Current Ektachrome process used for all major color reversal films and formats, first released in 1977. The conditioner, bleach and stabilizer baths were modified in the mid-1990s to remove the formaldehyde from the stabilizer: This change was indicated by changing the names of the conditioner step to pre-bleach step, and the stabilizer step to the final rinse step; E-6P: Used for push processing of Kodak Ektachrome films in general, and particularly for Kodak Ektachrome EPH ISO 1600 film, which has a speed of ISO 400 in normal E6, but is exposed at EI 1600 and push processed two stops in the first developer bath (10:00 @100.0 °F) to achieve the ISO 1600 speed rating.  (It is natural for a faster film to require a longer first development time.  This is sacrificed in the case of most color processing for consistency in processing, especially in machine processing.)

Other film manufacturers use their own designations for nearly identical processes. They include Fujifilm's process CR-55 (E-4) and CR-56 (cross-licensed with Kodak's process E-6; but with slight variations in the first developer); and the now-discontinued Agfachrome and Konica's CRK-2 (E-6 equivalent).

The E-4 process was generally discontinued after 1977, although continued in use for Kodak PCF (Photomicrography Color Film) until the 1980s, and for Kodak IE (Color Infra-red film) until 1996. This was due to a legal commitment by Kodak to provide the process for 30 years.

The Ektachrome process differs significantly from the Agfa Process AP-41, used generally until 1983 to develop films such as Agfachrome CT18 and 50s Professional.

Processing laboratories
The Washington (W) Processing Lab operated between 1967 and July 1999. The lab facility was located in Montgomery County at the address of 1 Choke Cherry Road, Rockville, Maryland.

The Palo Alto (P) California Processing Lab was located at 925 Page Mill Road, Palo Alto, California.

There were also Kodak processing laboratories in other locations, including Chicago, (Illinois), Hollywood, (California-H), Atlanta (Georgia), Findlay (Ohio), Toronto (Canada) and Hemel Hempstead (England).

Return of Ektachrome
On January 5, 2017, Kodak Alaris announced that Ektachrome would return in both ISO 100 35 mm still frame and Super 8 motion picture formats, before the end of the year. However, the release date was later pushed to 2018 after it was discovered certain materials used in its manufacture were now unavailable, requiring a reformulation. Kodak will manufacture the film and market the Super 8 version. Kodak Alaris will market the 35 mm still version.

The Super-8 version was exhibited at the 2018 Consumer Electronics Show, and was named Ektachrome 100D 7294.

In fall 2018, Kodak released the newly-formulated Ektachrome with 35 mm format being the first to arrive on September 25 and in Super 8 format on October 1.

On June 1st 2019, Kodak Alaris announced a wide coating trial of Ektachrome in 120 format for the end of July. Previously, in January 2019, a Kodak Alaris representative indicated work was progressing on Ektachrome in both 120 and larger formats. This project reached completion when, on December 10, 2019, Kodak Alaris announced the availability of Ektachrome E100 in a 120-format 5-roll propack and a 4 × 5 box of 10 sheets.

References

External links

Official Kodak information
 Kodak process E6  Ektachrome (color transparency) processing manual Z-119
 Kodak process E6 Q-LAB  processing manual Z-6 (more details than processing manual Z119 above)
 Ektachrome type EPH film data sheet
 Kodak sheet film notch codes

Processing of older Ektachrome films 
Processes E-2, E-3 and E-4:
 Film Rescue USA and Canada
 E-6 Ektachrome Super-8 DIY processing
 Fotostation UK & worldwide

Kodak photographic films